Vittuone is a comune (municipality) in the Province of Milan in the Italian region Lombardy, located about  west of Milan.

Vittuone borders the following municipalities: Arluno, Sedriano, Corbetta, and Cisliano.

Demographic evolution

References

External links
 www.comune.vittuone.mi.it/

Cities and towns in Lombardy